OTTU or Ottu may refer to:

Ottu, Haryana, a village in Haryana state of India
Ottu barrage, a weir on the Ghaggar-Hakra River in Haryana, India
Ottu (instrument), a drone-oboe played in Southern India
Sampson Ottu Darkoh, a member of parliament in Ghana
Organisation of Tanzania Trade Unions
OTTU Jazz Band, Tanzania
A variety of mango
Ottu, a Malayalam film